Octavio Cordero Palacios is a town and parish in Cuenca Canton, Azuay Province, Ecuador. The parish covers an area of 20.4 km² and according to the 2011 Ecuadorian census it had a population total of 2,271. The town is named after the Ecuadorian writer and inventor Octavio Cordero Palacios.

References

Populated places in Azuay Province
Parishes of Ecuador